The K7027/7028 Harbin-Mishan Through Train is Chinese railway running between Harbin to Mishan express passenger trains by the Harbin Railway Bureau, Harbin passenger segment responsible for passenger transport task, Habin originating on the Mishan train. 25G Type Passenger trains running along the Binsui Railway, Tujia Railway and Lindong Railway across Heilongjiang provinces, the entire 645 km. Harbin East Railway Station to Mishan Railway Station running 10 hours and 59 minutes, use trips for K7027; Mishan Railway Station to Harbin East Railway Station to run 10 hours and 21 minutes, use trips for K7028.

References 

Passenger rail transport in China
Rail transport in Heilongjiang